Asia World is a Burmese conglomerate.

Asia World may also refer to:
 Asia World station, Manila
 AsiaWorld–Expo station, Hong Kong